Abdul Motaleb Malik (1905–1977) was the last civilian Governor of East Pakistan.

Early life
He was born on 1905 in Chuadanga, Bengal Presidency, British India. He studied medicine in Vienna. He was a trade unionist in Bengal.

Career
From 1949 to 1955 he was the Minister for Minorities Affairs, and Works, Health and Labour of Liaqat Ali Khan cabinet. Afterwards he served as the Ambassador of Pakistan to Switzerland, Yugoslavia, Austria, People's Republic of China, Philippines, Australia and New Zealand. From August 1969 to February 1971, he was made the Minister for Health, Labour, Works and Social Welfare.

He was made the Governor of East Pakistan on 31 August 1971. His inauguration was attended by Abdul Monem Khan, Syed Azizul Huq, Fazlul Qadir Chaudhry, Khan A Sabur, Yusuf Ali Chowdhury, Sultanuddin Ahmad, Abdul Jabbar Khan, Ghulam Azam, and Pir Mohsinuddin. He resigned on 14 December 1971 with his entire cabinet after Indian MIG-21's had bombed a Dacca Government House where he was attending a high level-meeting. He then sought refuge in the Red Cross shelter at Dhaka Hotel Intercontinental. On 20 November 1972 he was sentenced to life in prison for waging war against Bangladesh.

References

1905 births
Governors of East Pakistan
People from Chuadanga District
1977 deaths
20th-century Bengalis
Members of the Constituent Assembly of Pakistan